The 2016 Hell in a Cell was the eighth annual Hell in a Cell professional wrestling pay-per-view (PPV) and livestreaming event produced by WWE. It was held exclusively for wrestlers from the promotion's Raw brand division. The event took place on October 30, 2016, at the TD Garden in Boston, Massachusetts.

Eight matches were contested at the event, including one on the Kickoff pre-show. For the first time ever for a WWE pay-per-view, a women's match was the main event, which was also the first-ever women's Hell in a Cell match that saw Charlotte defeat Sasha Banks to capture her third Raw Women's Championship. WWE promoted two other matches as main event matches, which were also Hell in a Cell matches: Kevin Owens defeated Seth Rollins to retain the WWE Universal Championship and in the opening bout, Roman Reigns retained the United States Championship against Rusev.

Production

Background 

Hell in a Cell is a gimmick pay-per-view (PPV) and WWE Network event produced annually in October by WWE since 2009. The concept of the show comes from WWE's established Hell in a Cell match, in which competitors fight inside a 20-foot-high roofed cell structure surrounding the ring and ringside area. The main event match of the card is contested under the Hell in a Cell stipulation. Announced on August 22, 2016, the 2016 event was the eighth Hell in a Cell and was held on October 30 at the TD Garden in Boston, Massachusetts. Tickets went on sale August 26 through Ticketmaster. The event exclusively featured wrestlers from the Raw brand division, following the reintroduction of the brand extension in July, where WWE again split its roster into brands where wrestlers were exclusively assigned to perform.

Storylines 
The event compromised eight matches, including one on the Kickoff pre-show, that resulted from scripted storylines, where wrestlers portrayed heroes, villains, or less distinguishable characters in scripted events that built tension and culminated in a wrestling match or series of matches. Results were predetermined by WWE's writers on the Raw brand, while storylines were produced on WWE's weekly television show, Monday Night Raw.

At Clash of Champions, Charlotte defeated Sasha Banks and Bayley to retain the Raw Women's Championship. On the October 3 episode of Raw, after Bayley took out Charlotte's protégé, Dana Brooke, backstage, Banks defeated Charlotte by submission to become a two-time champion. A rematch was scheduled for Hell in a Cell, and on the October 10 episode of Raw, Banks challenged Charlotte to a Hell in a Cell match, which Charlotte accepted. This was later confirmed by Raw General Manager Mick Foley, making this the first women's Hell in a Cell match.

At Clash of Champions, Roman Reigns won the United States Championship from Rusev. The following night on Raw, the rematch between the two ended in a double countout. On the October 3 episode of Raw, Rusev's wife, Lana, demanded a rematch, after which, Rusev attacked Reigns and tried to leave with the title belt, but Reigns attacked him with a Superman Punch and declared he would fight Rusev in a Hell in a Cell match, a request that was later approved by management.

At Clash of Champions, Kevin Owens defeated Seth Rollins to retain the WWE Universal Championship, largely due to the interference of Chris Jericho. In the following weeks, the two continued to taunt each other. A rematch between Owens and Rollins was scheduled for Hell in a Cell. On the October 10 episode of Raw, General Manager Mick Foley and Commissioner Stephanie McMahon made the match a Hell in a Cell match to prevent further interference. On the same night, Rollins defeated Jericho to keep the match one-on-one. Had Jericho won, the match would have become a triple threat match.

Dana Brooke defeated Bayley on the October 17 episode of Raw and attacked her the following week during an arm wrestling contest. On October 26, a match between the two was scheduled for Hell in a Cell.

At Clash of Champions, T. J. Perkins defeated Brian Kendrick to retain the WWE Cruiserweight Championship. Kendrick attacked Perkins after the match. The following night on Raw, Kendrick challenged Perkins to another match. The following week, Kendrick defeated Perkins by submission. On the October 10 episode of Raw, a match between the two was scheduled for Hell in a Cell.

At Clash of Champions, the final match of the best-of-seven series for a title opportunity between Cesaro and Sheamus ended in a no contest. The following night on Raw, Foley would not allow further matches between the two and decided to put Cesaro and Sheamus as a team against Raw Tag Team Champions The New Day. The following weeks, the two continued to argue with each other. On the October 10 episode of Raw, a title match between the two teams was scheduled for Hell in a Cell.

On the October 10 episode of Raw, Luke Gallows and Karl Anderson attacked Enzo Amore and Big Cass. The following week on Raw, Big Cass defeated Anderson. On October 24, a match between the two teams was scheduled for Hell in a Cell.

On October 26, a match pitting Cedric Alexander, Lince Dorado, and Sin Cara against Tony Nese, Drew Gulak, and Ariya Daivari was scheduled for the Hell in a Cell Kickoff pre-show.

Event

Pre-show 
During the Hell in a Cell Kickoff pre-show, cruiserweights Cedric Alexander, Lince Dorado, and Sin Cara faced Tony Nese, Drew Gulak, and Ariya Daivari. Alexander won the match for his team by pinning Gulak after executing the Lumbar Check.

Preliminary matches 
The actual pay-per-view opened with Roman Reigns defending the United States Championship against Rusev in a Hell in a Cell match. During the match, Reigns executed a Superman Punch for a near-fall. Reigns attempted a Spear, but Rusev countered with a Jumping Sidekick and pushed Reigns into the steel steps, which were positioned on the top rope, for a near-fall. Rusev applied The Accolade on Reigns, but Reigns escaped. Rusev re-applied The Accolade on Reigns, who was draped over the steel steps, using a steel chain, but Reigns countered with a Samoan Drop onto the steel steps. Reigns executed a Spear off the steel steps on Rusev to retain the title.

Next, Bayley fought Dana Brooke. In the end, Bayley performed a Bayley-to-Belly Suplex on Brooke to win the match.

After that, Enzo Amore and Big Cass wrestled Luke Gallows and Karl Anderson. Gallows and Anderson executed the Magic Killer on Enzo to win the match.

In the fourth match, Kevin Owens defended the WWE Universal Championship against Seth Rollins in a Hell in a Cell match. During the match, Owens accidentally sprayed the referee with a fire extinguisher, resulting in a second referee entering the cell to check on the downed referee. Chris Jericho ran into the cell and locked the cell door. Rollins attempted a Pedigree on Owens, but Jericho prevented the attempt, leading to Rollins performing a Pedigree on Jericho. Rollins performed a powerbomb on Owens through two tables stacked outside the ring, which was followed by a frog splash, but Jericho pulled the referee out of the ring to void the pinfall at a two count. Rollins attacked Jericho with a powerbomb into the cell wall. Owens performed a superkick and a pop-up powerbomb on Rollins for a near-fall. Rollins attacked both Owens and Jericho with a chair, but Owens executed a DDT on Rollins onto a chair. Owens performed a powerbomb through two chairs on Rollins to retain the title. After the match, Jericho attacked Rollins with a Codebreaker.

Next, T. J. Perkins defended the WWE Cruiserweight Championship against The Brian Kendrick. The match ended when Kendrick feigned a knee injury. A concerned Perkins checked on Kendrick, who attacked Perkins with a headbutt and applied the Captain's Hook. Perkins submitted, meaning Kendrick won the title.

After that, The New Day (Big E and Xavier Woods) defended the Raw Tag Team Championship against Cesaro and Sheamus. In the end, Cesaro applied the Sharpshooter on Woods. Meanwhile, Sheamus attacked Big E with The New Day's trombone, followed by Kofi Kingston executing Trouble in Paradise on Sheamus. As Kingston was not a contestant in the match, the referee disqualified The New Day for outside interference. At the same time, Woods submitted to Cesaro's Sharpshooter. However, as the referee had already issued a disqualification, Cesaro and Sheamus won the match, but The New Day retained the titles.

Main event 

In the main event, Sasha Banks defended the Raw Women's Championship against Charlotte in the first ever women's Hell in a Cell match. Before the cell lowered, Charlotte attacked Banks, leading to the two fighting outside the cell and into the crowd. Charlotte climbed the cell wall, but was knocked down by Banks. As Banks attempted to climb down, Charlotte caught Banks and powerbombed her through an announce table. Banks was about to be taken away on a stretcher and Charlotte to be declared the winner by forfeit, but Banks got off the stretcher and entered the cell, thus the match officially started. Banks dominated Charlotte early on, but the momentum shifted when Charlotte catapulted Banks into the cell wall for a nearfall. Banks applied the Bank Statement on Charlotte, but Charlotte got to her feet and tossed Banks over the top rope and out of the ring. Charlotte introduced a steel chair, but Banks performed a suicide dive on Charlotte. Later, Charlotte slammed Banks back first onto the chair for a nearfall. Outside the ring, Banks performed a Meteora on Charlotte from the cell wall. Banks then paid tribute to Eddie Guerrero by executing the Three Amigos suplexes and a Frog Splash on Charlotte for a nearfall. Banks re-applied the Bank Statement on Charlotte, but Charlotte escaped by rolling out of the ring. Banks performed her double knees on Charlotte through the chair for another nearfall. Charlotte then slammed Banks head first on the steel ring steps. Afterwards, Charlotte retrieved a table and attempted a Superplex on Banks through it, but Banks countered, knocking Charlotte onto the table. Banks retrieved another table, but Charlotte used it to ram Banks into the cell wall. Charlotte applied the Figure Four Leglock, but as she bridged into the Figure Eight, Banks attacked Charlotte with a chair to break the submission. After the two traded blows, Charlotte countered another Bank Statement attempt and performed three backbreakers on Banks for a nearfall. In the closing moments, Charlotte attempted a Moonsault on Banks through the table, but Banks cut her off. Banks then positioned the table on the opposite side of the ring and attempted a Powerbomb on Charlotte through it, but her back gave out. Charlotte took advantage by throwing Banks onto the table two times, and then executed Natural Selection to win the title for a third time.

Aftermath
While the 2016 Hell in a Cell event was held exclusively for Raw, the 2017 event was in turn held exclusively for SmackDown.

Heading into Survivor Series
Earlier in October before Hell in a Cell, SmackDown's Commissioner Shane McMahon and General Manager Daniel Bryan challenged Raw to three traditional Survivor Series elimination matches – involving each brand's best five male wrestlers, best five female wrestlers, and best five tag teams, respectively, to which Stephanie McMahon accepted. After Hell in a Cell, focus then shifted on determining which wrestlers would represent Team Raw for the three teams at Survivor Series the following month.

SmackDown's Intercontinental Champion Dolph Ziggler made an open challenge to any wrestler on Raw to face him for the title at Survivor Series. On the November 7 episode of Raw, Sami Zayn revealed that Mick Foley wanted him to face Ziggler for the Intercontinental title, and then defeated Rusev, solidifying his spot in the title match at Survivor Series. Also, Raw and SmackDown's General Managers came to a negotiation where Foley agreed that since SmackDown was defending the Intercontinental title against a Raw wrestler, he would allow a SmackDown wrestler to challenge new Cruiserweight Champion Brian Kendrick for that title, and if the SmackDown wrestler were to win, the entire cruiserweight division would move to SmackDown.

Continuing rivalries
After Survivor Series, Kevin Owens and Seth Rollins would continue their rivalry over the WWE Universal Championship. On the November 21 episode of Raw, they battled for the title in a No Disqualification match, with Roman Reigns and Chris Jericho banned from ringside. Owens won after Jericho, who was disguised as a masked fan, interfered and attacked Rollins. A match between Rollins and Jericho would later be scheduled for Roadblock: End of the Line, while Owens was also scheduled to defend his title against Reigns at the event.

Sasha Banks and Charlotte Flair would continue their rivalry over the Raw Women's Championship as well. On the November 28 episode of Raw, after invoking her rematch clause a week prior, Banks defeated Charlotte in a Falls Count Anywhere match in the latter's hometown of Charlotte, North Carolina to win the title for a third time, and was endorsed by Charlotte's father, Ric Flair, after the match. The following week, Banks challenged Charlotte to an Iron Woman match for the title at Roadblock: End of the Line, and Charlotte accepted.

Results

References

External links
 

2016
Women in WWE
Events in Boston
2016 in Boston
2016 WWE Network events
Professional wrestling in Boston
2016 WWE pay-per-view events
October 2016 events in the United States
WWE Raw